Trehörningen is a lake in Tyresta National Park in Stockholm County, Sweden.

Lakes of Stockholm County